Xanadu is a French television-series, also known as The Money Shot in the UK and the US, where it is shown on Walter Presents.

Content
The focus of the series is the eponymous porn film production company Xanadu of the Valadine family. The company has financial problems, because Alex, pater familias and founder of the company, does not want to get involved in the gonzo genre, which now defines the industry. His son Laurent, however, has recognized the signs of the times and wants to reposition Xanadu.
In the background of the series is the story of Elise Jess, Alex's first wife and mother of the three children Laurent, Sarah and Lapo (her name references French 1980s porn star Marilyn Jess). Elise Jess was the showcase of the company as an actress until she died under unexplained circumstances. Her death is cleared up in the last of the eight episodes.

Cast
Jean-Baptiste Malartre: Alex Valadine
Alex Lutz: Young Alex Valadine
Julien Boisselier: Laurent Valadine 
Nathalie Blanc: Sarah Valadine 
Swann Arlaud: Lapo Valadine 
Nora Arnezeder: Varvara Valadine 
Judith Henry: Anne Valadine 
Gaia Bermani Amaral: Elise Jess
Solène Rigot: Marine Valadine 
Audrey Bastien: Bettany Valadine 
Phil Holliday: Brendon
Jeffrey Barbeau: Julius
Mathilde Bisson: Lou

References

External links
 

2011 French television series debuts
2010s French drama television series
Television shows set in France
Adult video in fiction